Adi (lit. Ornament) is a community settlement in northern Israel. It is named after the nearby Biblical settlement of Tel Hali (Hali means "ornament" as Adi) in the tribe of Asher, mentioned in Joshua 19:25. Located near Shefa-'Amr, it falls under the jurisdiction of Jezreel Valley Regional Council.

The village was established in 1980 by native born Israelis and immigrants from the Soviet Union as part of the "Lookouts in the Galilee" plan.

Notable residents
Aviv Kochavi

References

External links
Official website

Community settlements
Hitahdut HaIkarim
Populated places established in 1980
Populated places in Northern District (Israel)
1980 establishments in Israel
Russian-Jewish culture in Israel